Khuda Haafiz: Chapter 2 – Agni Pariksha, also known as Khuda Haafiz 2, is a 2022 Indian Hindi-language action thriller film written and directed by Faruk Kabir. A sequel to the 2020 film Khuda Haafiz, it stars Vidyut Jammwal and Shivaleeka Oberoi.

The film was released theatrically on 8 July 2022. It began streaming online on ZEE5 on 2 September 2022.

Plot
After busting down the flesh traders in Noman and saving his wife Nargis, Sameer returns to India with Nargis, who battles depression and PTSD after the Noman incident. One year later, where the couple try to find their new normal but are seen to be struggling, despite therapy and medicines. Sameer's best friend Deepak loses his brother and sister-in-law to a car accident and they are survived by their 5-year old daughter, Nandini. However, due to his sales job, Deepak decides to put Nandini in an adoption home as he would not be able to care for her.  

Sameer suggests that he and Nargis take Nandini in for a week before Deepak decides anything, as he hoped that Nargis would bond with the sweet little girl and finally be able to come out of her depression. Nargis is unhappy with the new addition at first, but with the help of her therapist, takes the first step towards Nandini soon after. An accident with a dog bite causes Nargis to react and put herself into harm's way in order to save Nandini. She soon starts to form a bond with the little girl and some time later, the couple officially adopt Nandini. However, their happiness is short-lived as Basheshwar "Bacchu" Thakur, grandson of a powerful lady, Sheela Thakur forces his crush and Nandini's friend, Seema, to accept his feelings for her but she rejects him. 

Angered, Bacchu, along with his two friends, Shailendra and Abhinav, kidnaps Seema and Nandini, who tried to help the elder girl. On the other side, helped with an eye-witness of the kidnapping - an ice-cream vendor, Sameer, Nandini, and Seema's family reach out to the police for help who do not even write down their FIR as Sheela is too powerful in the region. After an entire day of searching, with the help of the ice-cream vendor, Sameer finally reaches the area where Bacchu and his friends had lit the kidnapping van on fire. Searching nearby in the fields reveals the two girls - brutally injured. They're rushed to the hospital and everyone realize that both have been assaulted. 

Nandini is unable to survive her injuries and this shatters Sameer and Nargis. The latter is too angry and leaves Sameer after telling him to only show her his face when their daughter's killers brutally hurt and hanging from a noose too. Sameer thrashes Inspector Tyagi for not helping to find Nandini, where he is sentenced to prison for 60 days. At the prison, Talha Ansari's informer informs him that Rashid Qasai send Jaiswal and his goons to kill Sameer. At night, Talha provides weapons for Sameer and reveals about Jaiswal's plans to kill him. In the morning,  Sameer kills Jaiswal and his goons with the help of Talha. 

In the hospital, Seema gains consciousness and reveals about Bachchu and his friends for abusing Seema and Nandini, and reveals about this to Ravi Kumar in a news channel. Sheela Thakur warns Nargis to stay away from Bachchu for Sameer after trying to scare her by repeating Nargis' own scary experiences. Despite her fears, Nargis remains cool and collected in front of Sheela and tells her that even if something does happen to Sameer in his quest for vengeance, then she will be still alive. 

Talha asks for help from his uncle to release Sameer. When Khalu asks Talha why he wanted to help Sameer, the latter man explains how Sameer was like a wounded lion and such men became bosses going forward. Khalu tells Sameer that Rashid knows where Bachchu two's friends are hidden. Sameer joins hands with Khalu and Saaharsh to eliminate Rashid and his men in the alleyway and they find Bachchu's friends Shailendra and Abhinav. Shailendra is scared and immediately reveals everything requesting amnesty. He tells the gang that how Bachchu and Shardul abused Seema repeatedly, while Abhinav was the one who abused the little Nandini.

The boys then took the girls into that very field and hunted them around, hitting them repeatedly with a cricket bat until they collapsed. He also revealed how the murder was actually Sheela's plan, how she ordered the Butcher to hide everyone, how she sent Bachchu abroad with his father, and that he has proofs of everything. When Sameer and Junaid, Seema's brother, hear about the crimes against the girls they get enraged. Sameer then takes a nunchuk from Khalu and brutally thrashes Abhinav with it until he collapses, probably dead. The police and media find Abhinav's naked body hanging from a tree in the morning. SSP Avinash Thakur - hired for the case due to its notoriety, Sheela's power over the local police, and the media attention takes Shailendra into custody and gives information about Bachchu to Sameer. 

Avinash explains that Bachchu and his father are in Egypt and India doesn't have an extradition treaty in place. While a request has been raised with the Foreign Ministry, everything would take months due to bureaucracy. However, he pointed out that there were no such restrictions on Sameer and Junaid. Sameer and Junaid board to Egypt and locate Kamlesh and Bachchu's location with the help of Hasnain, an arms dealer in a local market. The three attack and eliminate Kamlesh's henchmen's and chase them in a desert road of Pyramid which leads to the car chase. After crashing Bachchu's car, Sameer drags Bachchu out of the burning car and starts thrashing him brutally. When his father tries to intervene, Junaid starts fighting with Bachchu and Sameer puts Kamlesh down. 

Sameer then follows Bachchu, running after him and kills him. At the same time, Junaid shoots Kamlesh. Sheela Thakur mourns the death of Bachchu, while her henchmen try to keep the police out of the mansion and stop her arrest. She then grabs a hold of the woman she kept captive in her home and sexually abused who finally gathers her courage and stabs Sheela to death with her hairpin. Sameer wakes up at home and Nargis is revealed to be pregnant, much to Sameer's surprise. Everyone from outside the house praises Sameer as their leader. Just then, he sees Nandini in the crowd and they both wave at each other. The movie ends with Sameer waving at the crowd.

Cast 
 Vidyut Jammwal as Sameer Chaudhary: Nandini's adoptive father
 Shivaleeka Oberoi as Nargis Chaudhary: Nandini's adoptive mother
 Dibyendu Bhattacharya as Rashid Qasai
 Sheeba Chaddha as Thakur Ji a.k.a Sheela Thakurji, Bachchu's grandmother
 Rajesh Tailang as Ravi Kumar, a reporter
 Rukhsar Rehman as Dr. Roshni Acharya
 Riddhi Sharma as Nandini Chaudhary: Sameer and Nargis adopted daughter
 Bodhisattva Sharma as Basheshwar "Bachchu" Thakur, Sheela Thakurji's grandson
 Anushka Marchande as Seema
 Deepak Tokas as Deepak, Sameer's best friend
 Saud Mansuri as Abhinav, Bachchu's friend
 Pawan Chopra as SSP Avinash Thakur
 Abhishek Andrews as Sanu
 Danish Husain as Talha Ansari
 Monica Sharma as Kalki
 Anurekha Bhagat as maid of Sameer and Nargis
 Sidharth Bhardwaj as Khalu
 Asrar Khan as Yadav Ji "Thakur Ji's Secretary"

Production 
The principal photography of the film began on 22 July 2021 in Lucknow.

Soundtrack

The music of the film is composed by Mithoon, Vishal Mishra and Shabbir Ahmed while the lyrics written by Manoj Muntashir, Mithoon, Vishal Mishra, Kaushal Kishore, Faruk Kabir,     
Shabbir Ahmed and Ayaz Kohli. The background score of the film is composed by Amar Mohile.

Release
The film was initially scheduled to release on 17 June 2022 but was postponed. On 7 June 2022 it was announced that the film was theatrically released on 8 July 2022.

Home media 
The film premiered on ZEE5 on 2 September 2022.

Reception 
Dhaval Roy of The Times of India rated the film 3.5 out of 5 stars and wrote "Khuda Haafiz 2 is worth a watch for the heavy-duty action and the story that's high on emotion. The plot remains formulaic but the drama will keep you going". Zinia Bandyopadhyay of News 18 rated the film 3.5 out of 5 stars and wrote "If you have loved Khuda Haafiz and want to see Vidyut the actor, this film is for you. Quickly go for a recap before you watch Chapter II, and be prepared to be shaken after you see the film". Grace Cyril of India Today rated the film 3 out of 5 stars and wrote "Khuda Haafiz — literally means May God be your Guardian — does not have the most innovative script but it will still touch your heart".

Notes

References

External links 
 
 

2022 films
2022 action thriller films
Indian action thriller films
Indian sequel films
2020s Hindi-language films